Chennavarappadu is a village in Sangam mandal, located in Nellore district of Indian state of Andhra Pradesh.

References 

Villages in Nellore district